2020 in women's road cycling is about the 2020 women's bicycle races ruled by the UCI and the 2020 UCI Women's Teams.

Olympic Games  
The 2020 Olympics, set to be held in Tokyo, Japan, were postponed to 2021 due to the COVID-19 pandemic with the road cycling events taking place from 23 July to 8 August 2021.

World Championships

The World Road Championships were originally set to be held in Aigle and Martigny, Switzerland, from 20 to 27 September 2020. However, due to the COVID-19 pandemic in Switzerland the races in Switzerland were cancelled. The UCI are intending to run the World Championships on the original dates at a new to be confirmed locations. The final location of the World Road Championships is Imola in Italy.

UCI Women's WorldTour

Single day races (1.Pro, 1.1 and 1.2)

Stage races (2.Pro, 2.1 and 2.2)

Junior races

Continental Championships

Teams

Deaths
 April 29 - Eva Mottet, 25, French road cyclist.

References

 

Women's road cycling by year